National Highway 66 (NH 66) is a National Highway in India. This is the main National Highway to connect Pondicherry with Krishnagiri. It starts from Indira Gandhi Square in Pondicherry and runs north west till Tindivanam in Villupuram district then runs westward till Uthangarai via Thiruvannamalai and then joins NH 46 at Krishnagiri.

The  distance between Pondicherry and Tindivanam is widened into four lanes by Maytas - NCC Consortium.

Route 
Pondicherry - Thiruchitrambalam - Kiliyanur - Tindivanam - Vallam - Gingee - Pennathur - Tiruvannamalai - Pachal - Chengam - Singarapettai - Uthangarai -  Samalpatti - Krishnagiri

See also 
 List of National Highways in India (by Highway Number)
 List of National Highways in India
 National Highways Development Project

References 

66
66
National highways in India (old numbering)